Glendale Preparatory Academy is a Public Charter high-school and middle-school in Peoria, Arizona.   It is part of Great Hearts Academies. 

The curriculum emphasizes the Liberal Arts and has seminar-based classes and honors level courses.

References

Educational institutions established in 2007
Public high schools in Arizona
Charter schools in Arizona
Schools in Maricopa County, Arizona
2007 establishments in Arizona